Domenico Contarini may refer to:

 Domenico I Contarini (died 1071), 30th Doge of Venice
 Domenico II Contarini (1585–1675), 104th Doge of Venice